Kim Jong-hoe (Korean: 김종회, born 24 August 1965) is a South Korean educator and politician. He is the incumbent Member of the National Assembly for Gimje-Buan, as well as the Secretary-General of the New Alternatives.

Born in Gimje, Kim studied law from Wonkwang University. He is the son of Kim Su-yeon, the founder of Hakseong Lecture Hall, died in 2019.

Kim was brought to the New Politics Alliance for Democracy (NPAD; then the Democratic Party of Korea) in 2015. He joined the People's Party (PP) in 2016 and was elected as the MP for Gimje-Buan in the same year. On 12 January 2020, he was appointed as the Secretary-General of the New Alternatives.

Election results

General elections

References

External links 
 Kim Jong-hoe on Facebook
 Kim Jong-hoe on Twitter

1965 births
Living people
People from Gimje
South Korean politicians
21st-century South Korean educators